The Legal Aid Department often abbreviated as LAD, is a department in the Government of Hong Kong. It provides legal aid in legal representation for civil proceedings and criminal proceedings in District Court and above.

External links 
 Legal Aid Department

Hong Kong government departments and agencies